Szalma (its literal meaning in the Hungarian language being straw) is a Hungarian surname. It may refer to:
István Szalma (1886–1919), Hungarian printer
József Szalma (born 1966), Hungarian footballer
László Szalma (born 1957), retired Hungarian long jumper
Pál Szalma (born 1982), Hungarian goalkeeper
Tamás Szalma (born 1958), Hungarian actor

References

External links 

Hungarian-language surnames